Pope Anacletus (died ), also known as Cletus, was the bishop of Rome, following Peter and Linus. Cletus was a Roman who, during his tenure as pope, ordained a number of priests and is traditionally credited with setting up about twenty-five parishes in Rome. Although the precise dates of his pontificate are uncertain, he "...died a martyr, perhaps about 91". Cletus is mentioned in the Roman Canon of the mass; his feast day is April 26.

Name and etymology
The name "Cletus" means "one who has been called", and "Anacletus" means "one who has been called back". Also "Anencletus" means "unimpeachable" or "blameless".  

The Roman Martyrology mentions the pope as "Cletus". The Annuario Pontificio gives both forms as alternatives. Eusebius, Irenaeus, Augustine of Hippo and Optatus all suggest that both names refer to the same individual.

Papacy
As with much of the earlier papacy, little is known of Anacletus' pontificate. Earlier historical records are inconsistent in their usage of the names Cletus, Anacletus, and Anencletus and in the placement of these names in the order of succession. Generally, the order used by Irenaeus is used today, wherein Cletus and Anencletus refer to the same person, who succeeded Linus and preceded Clement. Traditionally, it was accepted that he reigned for twelve years, though the dates of that reign are questionable. The Annuario Pontificio states, "For the first two centuries, the dates of the start and the end of the pontificate are uncertain", before placing Anacletus' pontificate from AD 80 to AD 92. However, AD 76 to AD 88 are also frequently cited.

According to tradition, Pope Anacletus divided Rome into twenty-five parishes. One of the few surviving records concerning his papacy mentions him as having ordained an uncertain number of priests.

Pope Anacletus was martyred, ending his pontificate. A tomb ascribed to Anacletus is located near St Peter's tomb in the Vatican Necropolis field P, underneath St Peters Basilica. This tomb is located with tombs ascribed to Linus, Evaristus, Telesphorus, Hyginus,  Pius I, Anicetus, and Victor I. Little epigraphic evidence exists to support the ascription of these tombs to the early popes. His name (as Cletus) is included in the Roman Canon of the Mass.

Veneration

The Tridentine Calendar reserved 26 April as the feast day of Saint Cletus, who the church honoured jointly with Pope Marcellinus, and 13 July for solely Saint Anacletus. In 1960, Pope John XXIII, while keeping the 26 April feast, which mentions the saint under the name given to him in the Canon of the Mass, removed 13 July as a feast day for Saint Anacletus. The 14 February 1961 Instruction of the Congregation for Rites on the application to local calendars of Pope John XXIII's motu proprio Rubricarum instructum of 25 July 1960, decreed that "the feast of 'Saint Anacletus', on whatever ground and in whatever grade it is celebrated, is transferred to 26 April, under its right name, 'Saint Cletus'". Priests who celebrate Mass according to the General Roman Calendar of 1954 keep the July 13th feastday; but the feast has been removed from the General Roman Calendar since 1960, and as such is not kept even in the 1962 Missal. Although the day of his death is unknown, Saint Cletus continues to be listed in the Roman Martyrology among the saints of 26 April.

Literature
In the Divine Comedy, Dante mentions him as being placed in the "Heaven of the Fixed Stars" (Paradiso 27.41).

Notes

References
Donald Attwater and Catherine Rachel John, The Penguin Dictionary of Saints, 3rd edition, New York: Penguin Books, 1993. .
Louise Ropes Loomis, The Book of Popes (Liber Pontificalis). Merchantville, NJ: Evolution Publishing.  (Reprint of the 1916 edition. (Ends with Pope Pelagius, who reigned from 579 until 590. English translation with scholarly footnotes, and illustrations).
Richard P. McBrien, Lives of the Popes, (Harper, 2000).

External links
Writings attributed to Pope Anacletus/Cletus
The Society of Pope Saint Anacletus, an Independent Catholic association in the United States

1st-century deaths
1st-century Christian saints
1st-century Romans
Ancient Greeks in Rome
Burials at St. Peter's Basilica
Italian popes
Greek popes
Papal saints
Popes
Year of birth unknown
1st-century popes